The Palais Mamming Museum is the city museum of Meran, South Tyrol.

References

Museums in South Tyrol